The XXII Corps was a corps of the United States Army during World War II and the Cold War.  Its lineage was assigned to II Field Force, Vietnam, during the Vietnam War.

Lineage
Constituted 9 January 1944 in the Army of the United States as Headquarters and Headquarters Company, XXII Corps. Activated 15 January 1944 at Fort Campbell, Kentucky. Inactivated 20 January 1946 in Germany. Allotted 12 July 1950 to the Regular Army. Redesignated 5 January 1966 as Headquarters and Headquarters Company, II Field Force. Activated 10 January 1966 at Fort Hood, Texas. Redesignated 15 March 1966 as Headquarters and Headquarters Company, II Field Force, Vietnam. Inactivated 3 May 1971 at Fort Hood, Texas. Redesignated 2 September 1982 as Headquarters and Headquarters Company, XXII Corps.

Commanders

Major General Henry Terrell, Jr. (15 January 1944 – November 1944)
Major General Ernest N. Harmon (23 January 1945 – 10 January 1946)

Chiefs of Staff
Brigadier General Charles Herbert Karlstad (1944−1945)
Brigadier General Samuel Tankersley Williams (February 1945−January 1946)

Campaign participation
World War II
Rhineland
Central Europe

Vietnam
Counteroffensive
Counteroffensive, Phase II
Counteroffensive, Phase III
Tet Counteroffensive
Counteroffensive, Phase IV
Counteroffensive, Phase V
Counteroffensive, Phase VI
Tet 69/Counteroffensive
Summer-Fall 1969
Winter-Spring 1970
Counteroffensive, Phase VII

Bibliography 
 Wilson, John B., compiler (1999). "Armies, Corps, Divisions, and Separate Brigades". Washington, D.C.: Government Printing Office. 

22
22
Military units and formations established in 1944
Military units and formations disestablished in 1971